The 2012–13 Toto Cup Al was the 29th season of the third important football tournament in Israel since its introduction and the 9th tournament involving Israeli Premier League clubs only. 

It was held in two stages. First, fourteen Premier League teams were divided into three groups, five teams in groups A and C and four teams in group B. The teams played against each other once. The best 3 teams from groups A and C and the best 2 teams from group B were advanced to the quarter finals. The quarter finals were two-legged ties. The Semifinals and the Final were one-legged matches, that were held in a neutral stadium.

The tournament began on 4 August 2012 and ended on 23 January 2013. Ironi Kiryat Shmona were the defending champions, who made it their second Toto Cup Al title overall.

On 23 January 2013, Hapoel Haifa won the cup after beating Hapoel Be'er Sheva in the finals.

Group stage
The draw took place on 2 July 2012.

The matches were played from 4 August to 3 October 2012.

Group A

Group B

Group C

Elimination rounds

Quarterfinals
The draw for the quarterfinals was held on 9 October 2012. The first legs was played on 27 and 28 November, and the second legs were played on 11 and 12 December 2012.

Ironi Kiryat Shmona first tie was played on 12 December due to their involvement in the UEFA Europa League, with their second leg played on 18 December 2012.

|-

Semifinals
The draw took place on 16 December 2012.

The matches were played on 26 December 2012.

Final

See also
 2012–13 Toto Cup Leumit
 2012–13 Israeli Premier League
 2012–13 Israel State Cup

References

External links
 Official website  

Al
Toto Cup Al
Toto Cup Al